Esperance may refer to:

 Esperance (town), New York
 Esperance (village), New York
 Esperance, Quartier Militaire (village), Quartier Militaire, Moka, Mauritius
 Esperance, Washington
 Esperance, Western Australia
 Cape Esperance, Solomon Islands
 Battle of Cape Esperance, a WWII naval battle
 Exuperantia (Esperance), French saint
 HMS Esperance, two ships of the Royal Navy

See also
 Espérance (disambiguation)